Tajar Tetova was an Albanian military commander and çetë (band) leader in southern Albania and Macedonia.

History

Background
Born in Kalkandelen (modern day Tetovo) in the late-19th century, Tajar bey Tetova came from a noble landowning family. Tetova rose through the military ranks of the Ottoman empire, becoming a captain in the Ottoman army.

Albanian National Awakening

In 1908 he was sent by the Ottoman empire to support the Ottoman troops against the Albanian uprisings in Monastir (present-day Bitola). On June 22, 1908, captain Tajar Tetova working together with the Bashkimi club of Monastir, mutinied and fled into the mountains with seven officers and 150 Albanian soldiers to join southern Albanian Tosk revolutionaries. He formed a military league, demanding the retirement of the Young Turk government and general elections claiming that the existing cabinet was elected under terrorist agitation of the Young Turkish Committee. Tetova and his soldiers took all the weapons and ammunition company as well as two heavy machine guns from the Turkish in Monastir. Tetova expanded his insurgent movement in the area of Dibra, Korce and Kolonje. Tetova's group merged with Sali Butka fighters and together fought against the invaders of Albania.

He served for a short time as Mayor of Elbasan. A street in Elbasan is named after him.

Sources 

People from Tetovo
Activists of the Albanian National Awakening
Albanian activists
People from Kosovo vilayet
19th-century Albanian military personnel
20th-century Albanian military personnel
Albanians from the Ottoman Empire
Albanians in North Macedonia
19th-century Ottoman military personnel
20th-century Ottoman military personnel